Omar Hassan or Hasan may refer to:

Omar Hassan Ahmad al-Bashir (born 1944), Sudanese politician - president of Sudan
Omar Hasan (born 1971), Argentine rugby union player
Omar Hassan (skateboarder), American skateboarder
Omar Said Al-Hassan, chairman of the Gulf Centre for Strategic Studies, London
Omar Hassan (24 character), a character in the American television series 24
Omar Hassan (artist) (born 1987), Italian artist
Omar Hassan (volleyball) (born 1991), Egyptian volleyball player